The Ministry of Cultures, Decolonization, and Depatriarchalization (Spanish: Ministerio de Culturas, Descolonización, y Despatriarcalización) is the ministry of the government of Bolivia that provides for the preservation and protection of the cultures and artistic expressions of the indigenous peoples of Bolivia as well as promotes the country's tourism sector and process of decolonization and depatriarchalization.

History 
The history of the Ministry of Cultures began with the establishment of the Bolivian Institute of Culture (IBC) by President Hugo Banzer on 14 March 1975. The IBC —later renamed as the Secretariat of Culture— was a dependent entity of the Ministry of Education and Cultures, granted jurisdiction over the National Archives of Sucre, the Casa de la Libertad, and the Casa de la Moneda in Potosí. During Banzer's second presidency from 1997 to 2001, the secretariat was further elevated to the status of a vice ministry.

In 2006, during the early government of President Evo Morales —Bolivia's first indigenous president— the office was expanded as the Vice Ministry of Cultural Development. On 7 February 2009, through Chapter XX of Supreme Decree N° 29894 on the Organizational Structure of the Executive Body of the Plurinational State, Morales formed the Ministry of Cultures. The until-then vice minister Pablo Groux was appointed to head the ministry. With the enactment of the General Law of Tourism "Bolivia Awaits You", the cultures portfolio was expanded, and it was named the Ministry of Cultures and Tourism for the duration of Morales' term.

The transitional government of Jeanine Áñez eliminated the portfolio on 4 June 2020 to preserve funds to combat the COVID-19 pandemic, a decision criticized by both the opposition and members of Morales' Movement for Socialism (MAS-IPSP). After the return to power of the MAS in that year's general elections, President Luis Arce restored the office as the Ministry of Cultures, Decolonization, and Depatriarchalization on 13 November 2020.

List of ministers

References

External links 

2009 establishments in Bolivia
2020 establishments in Bolivia
2020 disestablishments in Bolivia
 
Bolivia
Cultures
Ministries established in 2009
Ministries established in 2020
Ministries disestablished in 2020